Haftevan is a village in Zulachay Rural District of the Central District of Salmas County, West Azerbaijan province, Iran. At the 2006 National Census, its population was 6,313 in 1,216 households. The following census in 2011 counted 7,995 people in 1,796 households. The latest census in 2016 showed a population of 8,203 people in 1,935 households; it was the largest village in its rural district.

In early 1915, the village was occupied by the Ottoman Army, who required local Christians to register for food rations. Instead, 700 family heads were executed in the village on the orders of Djevdet Bey. Russian Army commander K. Matikyan reported seeing "with my own eyes hundreds of mangled corpses in pits, stinking from infection, lying in the open. I saw headless corpses, chopped off by axes, hands, legs, piles of heads, corpses crushed under rocks from fallen walls". According to historian David Gaunt, "This was where the Ottoman soldiers learned to execute unarmed noncombatant Christians", leading to the Armenian genocide and Assyrian genocide.

In 1930, the village was populated by Armenians, Azerbaijanis and Kurds.

References 

Salmas County

Populated places in West Azerbaijan Province

Populated places in Salmas County

Kurdish settlements in Iran